All Love Lost is the seventh studio album by American rapper Joe Budden. The album was released on October 16, 2015, by eOne Music. The album features guest appearances from Katelyn Tarver, Jadakiss, Marsha Ambrosius, Emanny, Felicia Temple, Eric Bellinger and Yummy Bingham. The album was supported by two singles; "Broke" and "Slaughtermouse".

Singles
On July 20, 2015, the album's first single, "Broke" was released. On September 8, 2015, the music video was released for "Broke". On September 17, 2015, the album's second single, "Slaughtermouse" was released.

Critical reception

All Love Lost received universal acclaim from music critics. Kellen Miller of XXL said, "One becomes so engrossed in Budden’s hypnotic confession-as-art lyrical display of repeated drug relapses, depression and relationship drama that the music both forgives and transcends his past digressions." Jesse Fairfax of HipHopDX said, "Joe Budden’s recorded therapy gives a voice to the lost, but despite his enormous lyrical ability, All Love Lost finds Joe making music as much for his own catharsis than connecting his laments to either other emotions inside him or the world at large."

Commercial performance
The album debuted at number 29 on the Billboard 200, selling 14,229 copies in the United States.

Track listing

Notes
 signifies an additional producer.
 signifies a co-producer.

Charts

References

2015 albums
Joe Budden albums
Albums produced by AraabMuzik
Albums produced by Boi-1da
Albums produced by DJ Dahi
Albums produced by Vinylz
Sequel albums